= Kallehol =

- Village
- Location in Karnataka, India Kallehol (India)
- Coordinates: 15.8645°N 74.4200°E
- Country: India
- State: Karnataka
- District: Belgaum
- Talukas: Belgaum

Languages
  - Official: Kannada
- Time zone: UTC+5:30 (IST)
- PIN: 591128

Kallehol is a village in Belgaum district in Karnataka, India.
